St. Philip's African Orthodox Church is an African Orthodox church in Whitney Pier, a neighbourhood of Sydney, Nova Scotia. The church was designated a Nova Scotian heritage property in 1984.

References 

Heritage sites in Nova Scotia
Buildings and structures in the Cape Breton Regional Municipality
Churches in Nova Scotia